The Cleveland mayoral election of 1967 saw the election of Carl Stokes.

Stokes was the first elected African American mayor of a major American city (Cleveland was, at the time, the ninth largest city in the United States). His election came alongside the election of Richard G. Hatcher in the 1967 Gary, Indiana mayoral election. Together, these were the first elections of African-Americans as mayors of cities over 100,000. Stoke's election came in a city which was, at the time, 68% white.

Nominations
Primaries were held on October 3.

Democratic primary
Stokes unseated incumbent mayor Ralph S. Locher in the Democratic Party primary.

Republican primary

General election

References

Mayoral elections in Cleveland
Cleveland mayoral
Cleveland
November 1967 events in the United States
1960s in Cleveland